is a Nippon Professional Baseball pitcher for the Hokkaido Nippon-Ham Fighters in Japan's Pacific League.

He selected .

References

External links

1985 births
Asian Games medalists in baseball
Asian Games silver medalists for Japan
Baseball players at the 2006 Asian Games
Hokkaido Nippon-Ham Fighters players
Japanese baseball players
Living people
Nippon Professional Baseball pitchers
Medalists at the 2006 Asian Games
People from Nishinomiya
Baseball people from Hyōgo Prefecture
2017 World Baseball Classic players